Alozai railway station is located in Alozai village, Balochistan, Pakistan.

See also
 List of railway stations in Pakistan
 Pakistan Railways

References

Railway stations in Killa Saifullah District
Railway stations on Zhob Valley Railway Line